Carry On is a song by Australian band Motor Ace and is the first single on the band's second studio album Shoot This (2002). "Carry On" peaked at number 13 on the ARIA Charts.

Track listing
"Carry On" - 4:14
"Opportunity" - 4:06
"Pieces" - 4:07

Charts

Popular culture
 The song was used as the theme song for The Australian newspaper on television.

References

2002 singles
Motor Ace songs
Song recordings produced by Chris Sheldon
2002 songs